The List of shipwrecks in 1782 includes some ships sunk, wrecked or otherwise lost during 1782.

January

5 January

7 January

9 January

13 January

17 January

18 January

20 January

21 January

23 January

25 January

Unknown date

February

10 February

11 February

19 February

20 February

28 February

Unknown date

March

3 March

4 March

5 March

7 March

8 March

9 March

11 March

12 March

13 March

22 March

23 March

27 March

28 March

29 March

30 March

Unknown date

April

1 April

8 April

12 April

20 April

24 April

28 April

Unknown date

May

5 May

18 May

20 May

June

4 June

9 June

14 June

18 June

21 June

24 June

Unknown date

July

2 July

5 July

17 July

25 July

Unknown date

August

4 August

12 August

13 August

15 August

24 August

28 August

29 August

Unknown date

September

2 September

13 September

16 September

17 September

21 September

29 September

30 September

Unknown date

October

2 October

4 October

6 October

10 October

15 October

18 October

20 October

22 October

23 October

24 October

26 October

29 October

31 October

Unknown date

November

3 November

6 November

9 November

11 November

17 November

23 November

25 November

28 November

30 November

Unknown date

December

1 December

9 December

14 December

28 December

31 December

Unknown date

Unknown date

References

1782